Kwak Hae-seong (born 6 December 1991) is a South Korean footballer who plays as full back for Incheon United.

Career
He joined Seongnam FC in 2014.

References

External links 

Kwak Hae-seong at Asian Games Incheon 2014

1991 births
Living people
Association football fullbacks
South Korean footballers
Seongnam FC players
Incheon United FC players
K League 1 players
Footballers at the 2014 Asian Games
Asian Games medalists in football
Asian Games gold medalists for South Korea
Medalists at the 2014 Asian Games